Yam Cheshmeh (also Romanized as Yām Cheshmeh and Yām Chashmeh; also known as Yān Chashmeh) is a village in Dodangeh-ye Olya Rural District, Ziaabad District, Takestan County, Qazvin Province, Iran. At the 2006 census, its population was 50, in 14 families.

References 

Populated places in Takestan County